Yushkinskaya Volost is a rural settlement in Gdov Municipal District of Pskov Oblast in northern Russia inhabited by Russians, Estonians, Belarusians, and Romas. The administrative center is the village of Yushkino, which is, however, only the third largest by population after Trutnevo and Vetvenik.

Although remote and hardly accessible, this area attracts some tourists and dachniks (owners of seasonal second homes, usually log cabins or small cottages) due to its untouched nature, ecology, traditional way of life and some objects of cultural and historical heritage of local significance. Many of its villages are not connected to Gdov by regular public transport. The quality of rural roads is very poor and in winter and rainy seasons it is hard to reach some remote settlements by an ordinary car.

Only five of the 32 villages have permanent convenience stores, other are served by so-called avtolavkas (Russian: автола́вка), trucks with essential goods which arrive from Gdov once in a week or two and stay for around thirty minutes in each settlement.

There are two schools in Yushkinskaya Volost, one in Vetvenik and one in Trutnevo. Vetvenik school only offers primary education which covers grades from 1 to 4, while Trutnevo school has all grades of secondary education up to 11. The only post office in the area is located in Trutnevo.

Population

Constituent communities

References

Rural localities in Pskov Oblast